Hydrochara is a genus of hydrophilid beetles with 23 species in North America, Europe, Asia, and Africa.

Species
 Hydrochara affinis (Sharp, 1873)
 Hydrochara brevipalpis Smetana, 1980
 Hydrochara caraboides (Linnaeus, 1758)
 Hydrochara cultrix Smetana, 1980
 Hydrochara dichroma (Fairmaire, 1829)
 Hydrochara elliptica (Fabricius, 1801)
 Hydrochara endroedyi Smetana, 1980
 Hydrochara flavipalpis (Boheman, 1851)
 Hydrochara flavipes (Steven, 1808)
 Hydrochara fulvofemorata (Fairmaire, 1869)
 Hydrochara leechi Smetana, 1980
 Hydrochara libera (Sharp, 1884)
 Hydrochara lineata (LeConte, 1855)
 Hydrochara obtusata (Say, 1823)
 Hydrochara occulta (Orchymont, 1933)
 Hydrochara rickseckeri (Horn, 1895)
 Hydrochara semenovi (Zaitzev, 1908)
 Hydrochara similis (Orchymont, 1919)
 Hydrochara simula Hilsenhoff & Tracy, 1982
 Hydrochara soror Smetana, 1980
 Hydrochara spangleri Smetana, 1980
 Hydrochara vicina Bameul, 1996
 Hydrochara vitalisi (Orchymont, 1919)

References

Hydrophilidae genera
Hydrophilinae
Taxa named by Arnold Adolph Berthold